Elijah Jefferson Bond (January 23, 1847 – April 14, 1921) was an American lawyer and inventor. He is most known for inventing the ouija board.

Early life
Elijah Jefferson Bond was born on January 23, 1847, in Bel Air, Maryland to Charlotte Howard (née Richardson) and William B. Bond. His father was a judge. Bond graduated from the University of Maryland School of Law.

Career
Bond served in the Confederate States Army during the American Civil War. He worked as a lawyer in Baltimore until around 1918.

Inventions
Although he invented and patented items, including a steam boiler, he is best remembered for patenting what became known as the Ouija board. He filed for a United States patent on May 28, 1890. Charles W. Kennard and William H. A. Maupin were listed as assignees. The patent was granted on February 3, 1891. Bond sold the US distribution rights for the Ouija board to the Kennard Novelty Company.

Swastika Novelty Company
By 1907 Bond had relocated to West Virginia where he established the Swastika Novelty Company. The company produced a knock-off of Bond's original Ouija board called the "Nirvana".  The Swastika Novelty Company was a U.S. corporation that was incorporated in June 1, 1957, and dissolved on December 30, 2014. The company status was revoked after failure to file an annual report. The company's officers were  Bond, E. T. Crawford and J. E. Crawford.

Personal life
Bond married Mary Peters of Baltimore. They had at least one son, William B. Bond.

Bond died on April 14, 1921, at the home of his son at 3304 Clifton Avenue in Baltimore. He was buried in Baltimore's Green Mount Cemetery, beneath a marker that resembles an Ouija board.

References

Bibliography

Sources

External links

 

1847 births
1921 deaths
American occultists
American inventors
Burials at Green Mount Cemetery
Lawyers from Baltimore
People from Bel Air, Maryland
People of Maryland in the American Civil War
University of Maryland Francis King Carey School of Law alumni